Christopher Clark Spencer (born March 28, 1982) is a former American football center.  He was selected with the 26th overall pick in the first round of the 2005 NFL draft out of the University of Mississippi by the Seattle Seahawks. He has also played for the Chicago Bears.

Early years
Spencer was born in Madison, Mississippi. He was part of the nationally ranked and undefeated Madison Central High School in the Madison football team in 2000, which contained 5 current NFL players.  After his prep career, he was one of the most highly touted offensive line recruits in the Southeast.  His home ties led him to choose the University of Mississippi, where he  played alongside Madison Central teammates Doug Buckles and Mike Espy (of the Washington Redskins).  During the 2003 season, the Ole Miss Rebels had an impressive campaign, winning 10 games concluded with a Cotton Bowl Classic victory over Oklahoma State.

Professional career

2005 NFL draft
Spencer was considered one of the best centers available in the 2005 NFL draft, along with Jason Brown. He was projected a late second round pick, and was eventually selected 26th overall in the first round.

Seattle Seahawks
In his first season with the Seattle Seahawks, he played 7 games. In the 2006 season, he played in all 16 games for Seattle, starting 13 of them, most at the guard position, next to longtime Seattle center Robbie Tobeck. Spencer succeeded Tobeck as starting center for the 2007 season, as Tobeck had retired at the end of 2006.

Chicago Bears
On July 31, 2011, he was signed by the Chicago Bears to replace the outgoing Olin Kreutz. During the 2011 season, Spencer alternated between center and guard with Roberto Garza. In Week 4 against the Carolina Panthers, Spencer subbed for Lance Louis, but would himself go out of the game with a hand injury.

On November 22, 2012, Spencer was named as the Bears starting guard after Chilo Rachal was placed on the reserve/non-football injury list.

Tennessee Titans
On April 1, 2013, Spencer signed with the Tennessee Titans. On April 2, 2014, Spencer re-signed with the Titans on a new one-year deal.

Personal life
In 2006, he married Coastal Carolina Elite volleyball player Katherine Jensen.

References

External links
 Chicago Bears bio

1982 births
Living people
People from Madison, Mississippi
Players of American football from Mississippi
American football centers
American football offensive guards
Ole Miss Rebels football players
Seattle Seahawks players
Chicago Bears players
Tennessee Titans players